Sunil Bandacharya Joshi (born 6 June 1970) is an Indian former cricketer and former selector of the India cricket team. He played as an all-rounder who bowled slow left arm spin and batted left-handed. Sunil Joshi was appointed as chief selector of the senior men's cricket team on 4 March 2020.

Early life
Sunil Joshi was born in a Hindu Deshastha Madhwa Brahmin family on 6 June 1970 in Gadag, Karnataka, India. He used to travel  to Hubballi each morning for practice, and then returned to his native town of Gadag in time for school.

Domestic career
At state level he played for Karnataka throughout his career. In the 1995–96 season of the Ranji Trophy he achieved the impressive double of scoring 500 runs and capturing 50 wickets. He also played briefly for the Bedfordshire County Cricket Club in England during the 2004 Minor Counties Cricket Championship.

Joshi represented the Royal Challengers Bangalore in the 2008 and 2009 season of the Indian Premier League and was under contract till 2010.

International career
Joshi played both Test and One Day International cricket for India between 1996 and 2001. His usual role in the team was to provide runs from the lower order and act as a secondary spin bowler to support the likes of Anil Kumble. Despite being a regular in the national team during this period, he was not selected for the 1999 Cricket World Cup.

His most famous bowling performance for India came in an ODI match against South Africa in the LG Cup in 1999. He returned figures of 10–6–6–5 helping India to victory in that match. Three years later, the performance was rated in the Wisden 100 as the seventh best ODI bowling performance to that date.

On 21 June 2012, Joshi formally announced his retirement from international and first-class cricket.

Coaching career 
Joshi has coached the Hyderabad cricket team and more recently has been a coach for Jammu & Kashmir cricket team. Joshi tasted early success when his Jammu & Kashmir team beat the Ranji giants Mumbai, in the prelimnary rounds of 2014–15 Ranji Trophy. Earlier, he had coached his team to the Ranji Trophy Super League Quarter-finals in his debut season as coach from Plate Division.

In December 2015, Joshi was named the spin bowling coach of the Oman cricket team ahead of the 2016 ICC World Twenty20 played in India in March 2016.

In July 2016, Joshi was named as head coach of Assam cricket team next two Ranji Trophy season. He replace his former state teammate Sanath Kumar as the head coach Assam cricket team.

In August 2017, Joshi  was named as the spin bowling consultant of Bangladesh cricket team. In July 2019, he was appointed as the spin bowling coach of the United States national cricket team on a short-term basis.

In January 2023, Joshi was appointed as spin bowling coach of Punjab Kings for the 16th edition of the Indian Premier League.

Cricket administration 

The Board of Control for Cricket in India (BCCI) on 4 March 2020 announced the appointment of Joshi as the new chief selector of Indian men's cricket team.

References

External links

1970 births
Living people
India One Day International cricketers
India Test cricketers
Indian cricketers
Karnataka cricketers
Royal Challengers Bangalore cricketers
South Zone cricketers
People from Gadag-Betageri
Indian cricket coaches
Coaches of the Oman national cricket team
Cricketers from Karnataka
Recipients of the Rajyotsava Award 2005